Padangtegal is a village in Ubud, Bali, Indonesia.
It is the home to the Ubud Monkey Forest
which contains the Pura Dalem Agung Padangtegal temple as well as a "Holy Spring" bathing temple and another temple used for cremation ceremonies.

References 

Populated places in Bali